Change for a Sovereign is a 1937 British comedy film directed by Maurice Elvey and starring Seymour Hicks, Chili Bouchier and Bruce Lester. It was made at Teddington Studios by the British subsidiary of Warner Brothers.

Cast
 Seymour Hicks as King Hugo  
 Chili Bouchier as Countess Rita  
 Bruce Lester as Prince William  
 Violet Farebrother as Queen Agatha  
 Aubrey Mallalieu as Baron Breit  
 Ralph Truman as Archduke Paul 
 Wilfrid Hyde-White as Charles  
 C. Denier Warren as Mr. Heller  
 Florence Vie as Mrs. Heller  
 Daphne Raglan as Katrina Heller

References

Bibliography
 Low, Rachael. Filmmaking in 1930s Britain. George Allen & Unwin, 1985.
 Wood, Linda. British Films, 1927-1939. British Film Institute, 1986.

External links

1937 films
British comedy films
1937 comedy films
1930s English-language films
Films shot at Teddington Studios
Films directed by Maurice Elvey
Warner Bros. films
British black-and-white films
1930s British films